The shining-blue kingfisher (Alcedo quadribrachys) is a species of bird in the family Alcedinidae. It is found in Equatorial Africa.

The shining-blue kingfisher was described of by the French ornithologist Charles Lucian Bonaparte in 1850  and given its current binomial name Alcedo quadribrachys. The name Alcedo is the Latin word for a "kingfisher". The specific epithet quadribrachys is from the Latin quadri- for "four" and brachium meaning "arms" or in this case "toes". 
The shining-blue kingfisher is one of seven species in the genus Alcedo and is most closely related to the half-collared kingfisher (Alcedo semitorquata).

There are two subspecies:
 A. q. quadribrachys Bonaparte, 1850 – Senegal and Gambia to west central Nigeria
 A. q. guentheri Sharpe, 1892 – southern Nigeria to Kenya, northwest Zambia and north Angola

References

shining-blue kingfisher
Birds of the African tropical rainforest
shining-blue kingfisher
shining-blue kingfisher
Taxonomy articles created by Polbot